Ramazangiin Aldaa-nysh (born 23 November 1945) is a Mongolian sprinter. She competed in the women's 400 metres at the 1964 Summer Olympics.

References

External links

1945 births
Living people
Athletes (track and field) at the 1964 Summer Olympics
Mongolian female sprinters
Mongolian female middle-distance runners
Olympic athletes of Mongolia
Place of birth missing (living people)
Olympic female sprinters